Narrow Way may refer to:
 "The Narrow Way", a section on Pink Floyd's album Ummagumma
 "Narrow Way", a song by Bob Dylan from the album Tempest